The Uraltau range is a mountain range that runs in the Southern Ural from the Baymaksky District to the Zlatoust.

See also
Idel-Ural State

References

External links
Peakbagger.com page on the Ural Mountains
Ural Expeditions & Tours page on the five parts of the Ural Mountains

Ural Mountains
Mountain ranges of Russia
Landforms of Bashkortostan
Landforms of Chelyabinsk Oblast
History of Ural